The 1929 Kansas City Monarchs baseball team competed in the Negro National League during the 1929 baseball season.  The Monarchs compiled a 63–17 record and won the Negro National League championship. The team played its home games at Muehlebach Field in Kansas City, Missouri.

Personnel
Bullet Rogan was the team's player-manager. He played center field, compiled a .359 batting average and .449 on-base percentage and tallied 69 RBIs, 32 extra-base hits, 41 bases on balls, and 26 stolen bases. Rogan was inducted into the Baseball Hall of Fame. 

Right fielder LeRoy Taylor and second baseman Newt Allen also contributed mightily to the team's offensive output. Taylor compiled a .358 batting average, 51 RBIs, and 34 stolen bases. Allen compiled a .332 batting average with 36 extra-base hits, 54 RBIs, and 23 stolen bases.

The team also featured a talented pitching staff. Right-hander Chet Brewer, a 6'4", 22-year-old from Kansas, compiled a 15–2 record in 21 games with a 1.93 earned run average (ERA) and 64 strikeouts. Veteran left-hander Andy Cooper compiled a 15–4 record in 25 games with a 3.52 ERA and 104 strikeouts.  Cooper was later inducted into the Baseball Hall of Fame.

Roster

References

1919 in sports in Missouri
Negro league baseball seasons
Kansas City Monarchs